The Inter-American Defense College (IADC) is the educational entity of the Inter-American Defense Board, an independent entity of the Organization of American States. The College states that faculty, staff and student body are international, and that broad international participation provides an exceptional opportunity for the free exchange of ideas and forms a foundation for better inter-American understanding.  The IADC holds a permanent license from the District of Columbia Higher Education Licensing Commission (DC-HELC) and is accredited by the Middle States Commission on Higher Education.

Alumni 
General Otto Pérez Molina, Guatemalan Army (Ret), Former President of Guatemala
Michelle Bachelet, currently the United Nations High Commissioner for Human Rights and former President, Minister of National Defense, Minister of Health of Chile, and head of UN Women
Lucio Gutiérrez, former President of Ecuador
Paco Moncayo, former Mayor of Quito and General of the Ecuadorian Army during the Alto Cenepa War, current congressman 
Daniel Delgado Diamante, former Minister of Government and Justice of Panama
Almirante Mariano Francisco Saynez Mendoza, Mexican Navy, Secretary of the Navy (Mexico)
General Jorge Daniel Castro Castro, Director, Colombian National Police
General de División Ronaldo Cecilio Leiva, Minister of Defense of Guatemala
Major General William A. Navas, Jr., US Army (Ret), former Assistant Secretary of the Navy and former Deputy Assistant Secretary of Defense for Reserve Affairs
Major General Alfred Valenzuela, US Army (Ret), Author of "No Greater Love: The Life and Times of Hispanic Soldiers"
Major General Antonio J. Vicens, US Army, Adjutant General of the Puerto Rico National Guard 
Brigadier General Antonio J. Ramos, US Air Force (Ret)
Major General Efrain Vasquez Velazco. Venezuelan Army. (Ret), former Commander of the Venezuelan Army
Major General William J. Walker, current (38th) Sergeant at Arms of the United States House of Representatives and former Commanding General of the District of Columbia National Guard

References

Military academies
Organization of American States
Educational institutions established in 1962
1962 establishments in Washington, D.C.